McGrath Airport  is a state-owned public-use airport serving McGrath, a city in the Yukon-Koyukuk Census Area of the U.S. state of Alaska.

Formerly, the facility operated as McGrath Army Airbase.

As per the Federal Aviation Administration, the airport had 5,278 passenger boardings (enplanements) in calendar year 2008, 4,893 in 2009, and 5,242 in 2010. The National Plan of Integrated Airport Systems for 2011–2015 categorized it as a non-primary commercial service airport.

Facilities and aircraft 
The facility covers an area of 641 acres (259 ha) at an elevation of 341 feet (104 m) above mean sea level. It has two runways: 16/34 is 5,936 by 100 feet (1,809 x 30 m) with an asphalt surface and 5/23 is 2,000 by 60 feet (610 x 18 m) with a gravel surface.

For the 12-month period ending July 31, 2012, the airport had 11,000 aircraft operations, an average of 30 per day: 82% air taxi and 18% general aviation. At that time there were 10 aircraft based at this airport, all single-engine.

Airline and destinations 
Airlines offering scheduled passenger service:

Statistics

Incidents 
 On July 3, 1970, Douglas C-47 N154R of Reeder Flying Service crashed on take-off on a domestic passenger flight to Galena Airport, Alaska. Seven of the 27 people on board were killed.

References

External links
 FAA Alaska airport diagram (GIF)
 Topographic map from USGS The National Map
 

Airports in the Yukon–Koyukuk Census Area, Alaska
Essential Air Service